Gorton is a surname which translates in English as "dirty farm", and may refer to:

 Andy Gorton, English footballer
 Assheton Gorton, English production-designer
 Bea Gorton (1946–2020), American college basketball coach
 Bettina Gorton
 Cynthia Roberts Gorton (1826–1894; pseudonym, "Ida Glenwood"), American poet, author
 Don Gorton, Massachusetts attorney
 Frank Gorton, American sports coach
 Gary Gorton, American economist
 George Gorton, Californian political-consultant
 Jeff Gorton, American ice-hockey executive
 Jeffrey Gorton, American murderer
 John Gorton, Australian Prime Minister and Senator
 John Gorton (writer) (died 1835), English compiler
 Lewis G. Gorton, American educationalist
 Mark Gorton, American CEO
 Nathaniel M. Gorton (born 1938), American judge
 Neville Gorton, Bishop of Coventry
 Samuel Gorton, religious leader in colonial New England
 Slade Gorton (born 1832), co-founder of Gorton's of Gloucester
 Slade Gorton (1928–2020), American politician
 Stephen Wesley Gorton, Australian artist

See also
 Gorton